Dan Scripps is an American politician. He was a member of the Michigan House of Representatives for the state's 101st district until he lost to Republican Ray Franz in November 2010.  The district includes Leelanau, Benzie, Manistee and Mason counties, on the northwest coast of Michigan's lower peninsula. He attended Alma College during his undergraduate years. He received his Juris Doctor degree from the University of Michigan Law School in 2005. Beginning as a summer intern in 2004, he was employed by Latham & Watkins Law Firm in Washington D. C. until running for office in 2006. He returned to Latham & Watkins in 2011 until moving back to Michigan in late 2012, where he is President of the Michigan Energy Innovation Business Council.

Dan Scripps is married to Jamie Weitzel. They have a son Jack, born in 2010, and were expecting another child in summer 2014.

References

External links
State Representative Dan Scripps - Michigan House Democrats

Year of birth missing (living people)
Living people
Alma College alumni
Democratic Party members of the Michigan House of Representatives
University of Michigan Law School alumni
21st-century American politicians